Charles William Meredith van de Velde (born December 4, 1818 in Leeuwarden, died 20 March 1898 in Menton) was a Dutch lieutenant-at-sea second class, painter, cartographer, honorary member of the Red Cross and missionary.

Van der Velde attended the Naval Academy in Medemblik and became Lieutenant-sea second class. From 1830-1841 he worked at the topographical office in modern-day Jakarta where he eventually became director. In 1844 he had to return to Europe for health reasons, where he carried out cartographic, geographic and ethnographic work and was also employed as a draftsman, and missionary nurse. In 1844, on his return to Europe, he visited Ceylon, the Transvaal and Cape of Good Hope, where he supported the work of missions and for his services provided to French ships, was awarded a Legion of Honour.

Palestine

In 1851 Van de Velde visited Palestine, where he carried out various surveys, drawings, paintings and around one hundred watercolours for postcards. After his trip, he held lectures on Palestine in Geneva and Lausanne.

Red Cross
On 13 March 1864, van de Velde was one of the first delegates from the newly formed International Committee of the Red Cross to act as an impartial intermediary in the Second Schleswig War. He assisted the wounded and captured Prussian and Austrian soldiers and helped establish the Red Cross as a relief organization in the 1863 conference resolutions.

On 31 July 1867, Van de Velde was made an honorary member of the main Committee of the Red Cross, which included Willem Jan Knoop and Henri Dunant.

References

Bibliography

Further reading 

 Haim Goren, Mapping the Holy Land: the Foundation of a Scientific Cartography of Palestine, London, New York: I.B. Tauris, 2017

Maps
Map of the Holy Land / constructed by C.W.M. van de Velde ... ; engraved by Eberhardt and by Stichardt, 1858
Map of the Holy Land / constructed by C.W.M. Van de Velde;  2nd edition, 1865

1818 births
1898 deaths
19th-century Dutch people
Royal Netherlands Navy personnel
Dutch male painters
Dutch Protestant missionaries
Red Cross personnel
People from Leeuwarden
19th-century Dutch painters
Historical geography
19th-century male artists
Palestinologists
19th-century Dutch male artists